For elections in the European Union, Massif central–Centre is a European Parliament constituency in France.

It consists of the region of Centre-Val de Loire and the former regions of Auvergne, and Limousin.

Results
Brackets indicate the number of votes per seat won.

2009
For the 2009 election, five MEPs were elected from the constituency:

2004

Footnotes

External links
 European Election News by European Election Law Association (Eurela)

Former European Parliament constituencies in France
Elections in Auvergne (region)
Politics of Centre-Val de Loire
History of Limousin